Nordre Gravlund is a cemetery located between Ullevål University Hospital and the district of Sagene  in Oslo, Norway.

History
The cemetery was first established on the site in 1884. The cemetery has been expanding several times and now has an area of 16 hectares. There is a smaller chapel at the main entrance. Near the chapel is a memorial (NKP Minnesbauta) dedicated to the 23 members of the central committee of the Norwegian Communist Party  who were killed during World War II. It was designed  by sculptor Odd Hilt. The grave site for members of the Martinsen family contains the sculpture "Peace" (Fred)  by sculptor Lars Utne.

Notable burials
 Osmund Brønnum
 Cathinka Guldberg
 Anne Holsen
 Ivar Jørgensen
 Halvdan Koht
 Paul Koht
 Jolly Kramer-Johansen
 Arne Lie
 Martin Mehren
 Rudolf Nilsen
 Sølvi Wang

References

External links
 Arc! article 
 "Fra innvielsen av NKP-monumentet" – article in Friheten 
 

 
Cemeteries in Norway
Lutheran cemeteries
Buildings and structures in Oslo
Cemeteries in Oslo